The Diver is a 2001 Finnish short film directed by PV Lehtinen. It is an ode to diving and the aesthetics of movement. The film focuses on Helge Wasenius (born 1927), the grand old man of diving, who competed in two Olympic Games and performed clown dives. Lehtinen has said that the protagonist, Helge Wasenius, was his neighbour and childhood hero. When he started planning the film, an image of Wasenius hanging by his feet from the ten-meter diving tower of Helsinki Swimming Stadium was embedded in his head. The diving sequences in the film have been compared to Leni Riefenstahl.
Lehtinen has said he was inspired by Herb Ritts’ photographs of divers more than
Riefensthal.

Critical reviews 
Variety International Film Guide wrote following about the film: "A thoughtful voiceover and a skilful blend of archive and dramatised footage create a meditative mood, emphasised by touches of ambient music, giving the spectator space to reflect on his own emotions".

Awards 
The Diver won the Grand Prix and other main prizes at the Tampere Film Festival 2001.

References

External links 
 
 
 The Diver (Hyppääjä) trailer

2001 short documentary films
Finnish short documentary films
2000s Finnish-language films
Finnish black-and-white films